Hexadecimal floating point may refer to:

 IBM hexadecimal floating point in the IBM System 360 and 370 series of computers and others since 1964
 Hexadecimal floating-point arithmetic in the Illinois ILLIAC III computer in 1966
 Hexadecimal floating-point arithmetic in the SDS Sigma 7 computer in 1966
 Hexadecimal floating-point arithmetic in the SDS Sigma 5 computer in 1967
 Hexadecimal floating-point arithmetic in the Xerox Sigma 9 computer in 1970
 Hexadecimal floating-point arithmetic in the Interdata 8/32 computer in the 1970s
 Hexadecimal floating-point arithmetic in the Manchester MU5 computer in 1972
 Hexadecimal floating-point arithmetic in the Data General Eclipse S/200 computer in ca. 1974
 Hexadecimal floating-point arithmetic in the Gould Powernode 9080 computer in the 1980s
 Hexadecimal floating-point arithmetic in the HEP computer in 1982
 Hexadecimal floating-point arithmetic in the SEL System 85 computer
 Hexadecimal floating-point arithmetic in the SEL System 86 computer

See also
 Hexadecimal
 Floating-point arithmetic

References

Floating point
16